Astrid Heligonda Roemer (born 27 April 1947) is a Surinamese-Dutch writer and teacher. The Dutch-language author has published novels, drama and poetry, and in December 2015 was announced as the winner of the P. C. Hooft Award, considered the most important literary prize in the Netherlands and Belgium, which was presented in May 2016.

Biography
Roemer was born in Paramaribo, the capital of Suriname, and attended the city's Kweekschool (Surinaams Pedagogisch Instituut; SPI), a teaching college, where in 1965, she was discovered as a poet. She travelled to the Netherlands the following year, and went back and forth between Suriname and the Netherlands (she also lived in The Hague) until the 1970s. In 1970, she published her first book of poetry, Sasa mijn actuele zijn. Her first novel, Neem mij terug Suriname (Take Me Back Suriname, 1974), was very successful in Suriname, and was rewritten as Nergens ergens ("Nowhere somewhere", 1983). She took up residence permanently in the Netherlands in 1975, after being fired from her teaching job for refusing to celebrate the Sinterklaas celebrations, which include a blackface character named Zwarte Piet.

From the 1970s on, she was a prolific writer, publishing novels, drama, and poetry; her breakthrough in the Netherlands was the fragmentary novel Over de gekte van een vrouw ("On the madness of a woman"), a work investigating identity and the oppression of women, which established her as a feminist writer and made her a role model for lesbians. She spent some time in the city council of The Hague for the GroenLinks party, in 1989, but left quickly after a dispute with the party. Between 1996 and 1998, she published a trilogy that is now among the best-known of her works, though no longer in print: Gewaagd leven (1996), Lijken op liefde (1997) and Was getekend (1998). The novels were published together as Roemers drieling ("Roemer's triplets", 2001). The German translation of Lijken op liefde was awarded the LiBeratur Prize.

From 2006 to 2009, Roemer lived in Suriname again. In her later years, she has published little. Her autobiography, Zolang ik leef ben ik niet dood ("As long as I'm living I'm not dead"), appeared in 2004, and a collection of love poems called Afnemend ("Diminishing") was published in 2012, in only 125 copies. Roemer disappeared from the public eye, and travelled the world for 15 years, with "cat, laptop, and backpack". Her first public appearance in a long time was planned for the 2015 premiere of De wereld heeft gezicht verloren, a biographical documentary by Cindy Kerseborn. Kerseborn had looked for Roemer on the Scottish island of Skye but finally found her in a Belgian monastery. Roemer did not show up for the premiere but sent a text message urging people to love one another.

Roemer won the P. C. Hooft Award for 2016 over the favoured candidate, Arnon Grunberg, becoming the first Caribbean author to win the award. According to the jury, Roemer's novels are a literary imagining of the history of Suriname, a history that is not very well known in the Netherlands outside of the topics of slavery and the December murders but is "inextricably intertwined with the history of our country...and thus, by way of Roemer's unique oeuvre, with our literature". The jury added, "political engagement and literary experiment go hand in hand with Roemer".

In 2021, Roemer received the Prijs der Nederlandse Letteren, becoming the first Surinamese winner.  The jury's nomination states: "With her novels, plays and poems Astrid H. Roemer occupies a unique position in the Dutch literary landscape. Her work is unconventional, poetic and lived through. Roemer succeeds in connecting themes from recent national history, such as corruption, tension, guilt, colonization and decolonization, with small history, the story on a human scale."

Bibliography 

The works of Roemer based on her Digital Library for Dutch Literature profile:
 1970: Sasa mijn actuele zijn (Sasa my present being)
 1974: Neem mij terug, Suriname  (Take me back, Suriname)
 1975: De wereld heeft gezicht verloren (The world has lost face)
 1982: Over de gekte van een vrouw (On the madness of a woman)
 1983: Nergens ergens (Nowhere somewhere)
 1985: En wat dan nog?! (And so what?!)
 1985: Noordzee Blues (North Sea Blues)
 1987: Levenslang gedicht (Lifelong poem)
 1987: Waarom zou je huilen mijn lieve, lieve... (Why would you cry my dear, dear...)
 1987: Wat heet anders (What is so different)
 1988: De achtentwintigste dag (The twenty-eighth day)
 1988: De orde van de dag (The order of the day)
 1988: Het spoor van de jakhals (The trace of the jackall)
 1989: Alles wat gelukkig maakt (All that makes happy)
 1989: Oost West Holland Best (East West Holland Best)
 1990: Een naam voor de liefde (A name for love)
 1991: Dichter bij mij schreeuw ik (Closer to me I'll scream)
 1993: Niets wat pijn doet (Nothing that hurts)
 1996: Gewaagd leven (Daring life)
 1997: Lijken op liefde (Looks like love)
 1997: Suriname (Suriname)
 1998: Was getekend (Signed)
 2001: 'Miauw' ('Meow')
 2004: Zolang ik leef ben ik niet dood (As long as I live I'm not dead)
 2006: Over de gekte van een vrouw (On the madness of a woman)

See also
 Surinamese literature

References 

1947 births
Dutch-language poets
Dutch-language writers
Living people
P. C. Hooft Award winners
People from Paramaribo
Surinamese dramatists and playwrights
Surinamese emigrants to the Netherlands
Surinamese novelists
Surinamese poets
Surinamese women poets
Surinamese women writers
Women autobiographers
International Writing Program alumni
Autobiographers
Dutch women novelists
20th-century women writers